Wood Love (German title: Ein Sommernachtstraum) is a 1925 German silent comedy film directed by Hans Neumann and starring Werner Krauss, Valeska Gert and Alexander Granach. It was an adaptation of William Shakespeare's A Midsummer Night's Dream.

Ernö Metzner worked as the film's art director.

Cast
 Werner Krauss as Bottom 
 Valeska Gert as Puck
 Alexander Granach as Waldschrat
and in alphabetical order
 Hans Albers as Demetrius
 Charlotte Ander as Hermia
 Theodor Becker as Theseus
 Hans Behrendt   
 Wilhelm Bendow as Flaut
 Paul Biensfeldt   
 Walter Brandt as Schnock 
 Tamara Geva as Oberon
 Ernst Gronau as Squenz 
 Armand Guerra as Wenzel 
 Paul Günther as Egeus 
 Martin Jacob as Schlucker 
 Adolf Klein   
 Lori Leux as Titania
 André Mattoni as Lysander
 Fritz Rasp as Schnauz 
 Rose Veldtkirch   
 Barbara von Annenkoff as Helena
 Ruth Weyher as Hippolyta 
 Bruno Ziener as Milon

References

Bibliography
 Kreimeier, Klaus. The Ufa Story: A History of Germany's Greatest Film Company, 1918-1945. University of California Press, 1999.

External links

1925 films
1926 comedy films
1926 films
German comedy films
German fantasy comedy films
Films of the Weimar Republic
German silent feature films
Films based on A Midsummer Night's Dream
1920s fantasy comedy films
UFA GmbH films
German black-and-white films
1925 comedy films
Silent comedy films
1920s German films